Jan Philipp Fürchtegott Reemtsma (born 26 November 1952) is a German literary scholar, author, and patron who founded and was the long-term director of the Hamburg Institute for Social Research. Reemtsma lives and works mainly in Hamburg.

Biography
Reemtsma was born in Bonn, West Germany. The son of cigarette manufacturer  and Gertrud Reemtsma (née Zülch), he studied German literature and philosophy at the University of Hamburg (PhD), where he has been active as a professor of German literature since 1996. Reemtsma sold his inherited majority stake in the Reemtsma group in 1980 to the Hamburg entrepreneurial family Herz (Tchibo). In 1996, Reemtsma was kidnapped.

Musician and music producer Johann Scheerer is his son.

Activities
In 1984 he founded the Hamburger Institut für Sozialforschung (Hamburg Institute for Social Research (HIS)). 

Reemtsma and HIS produced two exhibitions about war crimes of the Wehrmacht collectively known as the Wehrmacht exhibition. The first exhibition opened in 1995, and traveled to 33 German and Austrian cities. Reemtsma has also written a bestselling account of his experiences during a 1996 kidnapping (published in German as Im Keller in 1997, in English as In the Cellar in 1999, in French as Dans la cave in 2000 as well as in many other languages).

Hamburg Institute for Social Research

From 1984 to 2015, Reemtsma was the director of the Hamburger Institut für Sozialforschung (HIS).

The three research units of the HIS are:
 Theory and History of Violence
 The Society of the Federal Republic of Germany
 Nation and Society

Reemtsma also headed the 1995 project Violence and Destructiveness in the Twentieth Century.

Two exhibitions were realized:
 "200 Days and 1 Century" focused on violence in the twentieth century and was presented in Germany, Austria, and in Caen, France.
 an exhibition on crimes of the German Wehrmacht, the first of two highly publicized exhibitions which drew more than one million visitors at some forty venues in Germany, Austria, and Luxemburg.

Memberships
 Deutsche Akademie für Sprache und Dichtung
 Freie Akademie der Künste Hamburg

Awards

 Copernicus Medal of the University of Kraków (1987)
  (1997)
 Honorary doctorate of the University of Konstanz (1999)
  Mercator-Professorship University of Duisburg-Essen (1999)
 Nicolas Born Prize (2001)
 Leibniz Medal of the Berlin-Brandenburg Academy of Sciences (2002)
 Heinz Galinski Prize for fostering German-Jewish understanding (2003)
 Honorary doctorate of the University of Magdeburg (2007)
 Teddy Kollek Award of the Jerusalem Foundation (ceremony in Israel's Knesset in October 2007)
  (2008)
 Ferdinand Tönnies Medal of the University of Kiel (2008)
 Schiller-Professorship of the University of Jena (2008)
 Award for Outstanding Contributions to the Influence of Sociology on Public Life of the Deutsche Gesellschaft für Soziologie (German Sociological Association; 2009)
 Jewish Museum Award for Understanding and Tolerance (Berlin; 2010)
 Schiller Prize of the City of Mannheim (2011)
 Schader Award (Darmstadt; 2011)
  (2022)
  (2022)

Selected publications

In German
 with Mauro Basaure, Rasmus Willig (eds.): Erneuerung der Kritik. Axel Honneth im Gespräch [Renewing Critique: A Conversation with Axel Honneth], Frankfurt a.M.: Campus, 2009
 Vertrauen und Gewalt. Versuch über eine besondere Konstellation der Moderne [Trust and Violence: An Attempt to Understand a Unique Constellation in Modernity], Hamburg 2008
 Lessing in Hamburg [Lessing in Hamburg], München 2007
 Über Arno Schmidt: Vermessungen eines poetischen Terrains [About Arno Schmidt: Surveying a Poetic Terrain], Frankfurt/M 2006
 Das unaufhebbare Nichtbescheidwissen der Mehrheit: Sechs Reden über Literatur und Kunst [The Majority's Unalterable Lack of Understanding: Six Lectures on Literature and Art] München 2005
 Folter im Rechtsstaat? [Torture in Constitutional States?], Hamburg 2005
 Rudi Dutschke Andreas Baader und die RAF [Rudi Dutschke Andreas Baader and the RAF],  Hamburg 2005 (with Wolfgang Kraushaar and Karin Wieland)
 Warum Hagen Jung-Ortlieb erschlug. Unzeitgemäßes über Krieg und Tod [Why Hagen Slew Jung-Ortlieb: Untimely Thoughts on War and Death], München 2003
 Verbrechensopfer. Gesetz und Gerechtigkeit [Victims of Crime: Law and Justice], München 2002 (with Winfried Hassemer)
 Die Gewalt spricht nicht. Drei Reden [Violence Does Not Speak: Three Lectures], Stuttgart 2002
 Wie hätte ich mich verhalten? und andere nicht nur deutsche Fragen [How Would I Have Acted? And Other, Not Only German Questions], München 2001
 Der Liebe Maskentanz. Aufsätze zum Werk Christoph Martin Wielands [Love's Masquerade Dance: Essays on the Works of Christoph Martin Wieland], Zürich 1999
 Das Recht des Opfers auf die Bestrafung des Täters – als Problem [The Victim's Right to Punishment of the Perpetrator – as a Problem], München 1999
 Mord am Strand. Allianzen von Zivilisation und Barbarei. Aufsätze und Reden [Murder on the Beach: Alliances of Civilization and Barbarianism: Essays and Lectures], Hamburg 1998
 Der Vorgang des Ertaubens nach dem Urknall. 10 Reden und Aufsätze [The Process of Turning Deaf after the Big Bang: Ten Lectures and Essays], Zürich 1995
 Das Buch vom Ich. Christoph Martin Wielands "Aristipp und einige seiner Zeitgenossen". [The Book of Ego: Christoph Martin Wieland's "Aristipp and Some of His Contemporaries"], Zürich 1993

In English
 
 
 "The Concept of the War of Annihilation: Clausewitz, Ludendorff, Hitler", In: 
 

 

 "R.J.B. Bosworth: Explaining Auschwitz and Hiroshima. History Writing and the Second World War, 1945–1990", Book Review, in: Journal of Modern History, 69/1, March 1997
 "Wolfgang Sofsky: Die Ordnung des Terrors. Das Konzentrationslager", Book Review, in: International Review of Social History, Vol. 40, Part 1, April 1995-->

In French

References

Further reading

External links
 
 
 
 
 

1952 births
German philanthropists
Living people
Academic staff of the University of Hamburg
Members of the European Academy of Sciences and Arts
University of Hamburg alumni